Isabelo "Chabelo" Molina Hernandez (born November 11, 1939) is a Puerto Rican politician and was the mayor of Vega Alta from 1992 to 2017. Molina is affiliated with the New Progressive Party (PNP) and has served as mayor since 2005. Has a bachelor's degree in secondary education from the University of Puerto Rico.

References

Living people
Mayors of places in Puerto Rico
New Progressive Party (Puerto Rico) politicians
People from Vega Alta, Puerto Rico
University of Puerto Rico alumni
1939 births